The Burmese bushtit (Aegithalos sharpei) is a species of bird in the family Aegithalidae.
It is endemic to the Chin Hills of Myanmar.

Its natural habitat is temperate forests.

References 

sooty bushtit
Endemic birds of Myanmar
Burmese bushtit